Tajikistan participated at the 2018 Summer Youth Olympics in Buenos Aires, Argentina from 6 October to 18 October 2018.

Judo

Individual

Team

Shooting

Individual

Mixed

Swimming

References

2018 in Tajikistani sport
Nations at the 2018 Summer Youth Olympics
Tajikistan at the Youth Olympics